Selidosema agoraea is a moth of the family Geometridae first described by Edward Meyrick in 1892. It is known from Australia.

References

Boarmiini